I Am Ready is American country music artist Steve Wariner's tenth studio album. It was released in 1991 on Arista Nashville as his first for the label, following his departure from MCA Records. Singles from the album include "Leave Him Out of This", "The Tips of My Fingers" (a cover of Bill Anderson's 1960 hit), "A Woman Loves", "Crash Course in the Blues" and "Like a River to the Sea". Respectively, these reached #6, #3, #9, #32 and #30 on the Billboard country charts. The album was certified gold by the RIAA, and was Wariner's first album to achieve that certification.

Track listing

Production
Produced By Scott Hendricks & Tim DuBois
Recorded & Engineered By Bill Deaton & Scott Hendricks
Additional Recording & Engineering By Scott Hendricks, Mike Clute & John Kunz
Mixed By Scott Hendricks; Additional Mix Engineering By John Kunz, Brad Jones, Gary Paczosa & Greg Parker
Digital Editing By Glenn Meadows
Mastered By Denny Purcell

Personnel
Eddie Bayers – drums (all tracks)
Bruce Bouton – steel guitar (track 8)
Carol Chase – background vocals (track 9)
Bill Cuomo – keyboards (tracks 4, 5), organ (tracks 2, 7), piano (track 3)
Bob DiPiero – background vocals (track 1)
Buddy Emmons – steel guitar (track 6)
Sonny Garrish – steel guitar (all tracks except 8 & 10)
Steve Gibson – 12-string electric guitar (track 1), electric guitar (track 4), mandolin (track 3)
Vince Gill – background vocals (tracks 2, 4)
Scott Hendricks – acoustic guitar (track 4), electric guitar (track 7), floor tom (track 8), power piano (track 4)
David Hungate – bass guitar (all tracks)
John Barlow Jarvis – keyboards (track 6), piano (tracks 1, 2, 4, 7, 9, 10), Wurlitzer (tracks 3, 8)
Albert Lee – electric guitar (track 10)
Allyn Love – steel guitar (track 9)
Mac McAnally – acoustic guitar (all tracks), background vocals (tracks 3, 7-9)
Terry McMillan – percussion (tracks 3, 5, 6), harmonica (track 10)
Mark O'Connor – fiddle (tracks 2, 3, 5, 9, 10)
John Scott Sherrill – background vocals (track 1)
Harry Stinson – background vocals (track 6)
Billy Thomas – background vocals (tracks 4, 7)
Wendy Waldman – background vocals (track 6)
Steve Wariner – lead vocals (all tracks), background vocals (tracks 2, 3, 8), acoustic guitar solo (track 6), Del Vechio guitar (track 5), electric guitar (track 10), electric guitar solo (track 8)
Reggie Young – electric guitar (all tracks)
Andrea Zonn – background vocals (track 2)

Chart performance

1991 albums
Albums produced by Scott Hendricks
Arista Records albums
Steve Wariner albums